Louisville is a village in Clay County, Illinois, United States, along the Little Wabash River. The population was 1,136 at the 2020 census. It is the county seat of Clay County.

The proper pronunciation of "Louisville" in the local dialect of mid-southern American is "Loose-vil" and is phonetically distinct from the southern American pronunciation of "lou-vle"

History
The village was named for the Lewis family of settlers.

Grand Army of the Republic
The Grand Army of the Republic had a post known as the Louisville Post, No. 249 with the post name of William J. Stephenson. The post received its charter May 18, 1883.

Geography
Louisville is located near the center of Clay County at  (38.771356, -88.506301). U.S. Route 45 passes through the village, leading north  to Effingham and south  to Flora.

The Little Wabash River flows past the east side of the village.

Demographics

As of the 2020 census there were 1,136 people, 527 households, and 252 families residing in the village. The racial makeup of the village was 93.22% White, 0.18% African American, 0.18% Native American, 0.18% Asian, 2.38% from other races, and 3.87% from two or more races. Hispanic or Latino of any race were 3.26% of the population.

There were 527 households, out of which 31.12% had children under the age of 18 living with them, 35.86% were married couples living together, 11.95% had a female householder with no husband present, and 52.18% were non-families. 47.82% of all households were made up of individuals, and 26.94% had someone living alone who was 65 years of age or older. The average household size was 2.63 and the average family size was 1.96.

The village's age distribution consisted of 18.5% under the age of 18, 3.7% from 18 to 24, 27.9% from 25 to 44, 24.5% from 45 to 64, and 25.4% who were 65 years of age or older. The median age was 44.8 years. For every 100 females, there were 109.9 males. For every 100 females age 18 and over, there were 94.2 males.

The median income for a household in the village was $35,298, and the median income for a family was $48,750. Males had a median income of $38,507 versus $22,109 for females. The per capita income for the village was $23,773. About 17.5% of families and 21.0% of the population were below the poverty line, including 27.5% of those under age 18 and 6.1% of those age 65 or over.

Notable people
 Bailey Zimmerman, country artist
 Tom Richardson, pinch hitter for the St. Louis Browns; born in Louisville
 John Riley Tanner, governor of Illinois January 11, 1897 – January 14, 1901; home and farm in Louisville
 Andy Haines Hitting Coach for the Pittsburgh Pirates

References

External links
Village of Louisville official website

Villages in Clay County, Illinois
Villages in Illinois
County seats in Illinois